Charles Pitts may refer to:

Charles Pitts (1947–2012), American soul and blues guitarist
Charles Pitts (broadcaster) (1941-2015), American gay activist and radio personality

See also
 Charles Pitt (18th century), English medical doctor
 Charles Pittman (disambiguation)
 Charles Potts (born 1943), American counter-culture poet